Absynthe may refer to:
An alternate spelling of absinthe, an alcoholic beverage
Absynthe (album), a 2003 album by Monsieur Camembert
The Absynthe, a Trent University campus newsmedia organization